China Flying Dragon Aviation is an airline based in Harbin, Heilongjiang, China. It operates short-haul passenger and cargo charter flights, as well as maritime surveillance, aerial photography and forestry protection services. Its main base is Harbin Taiping International Airport.

History 
The airline was established and started operations in 1981. It is owned in a joint venture by the Harbin Aircraft Manufacturing Corporation and the former Ministry of Geology and Mineral Resources, now part of the Ministry of Land and Resources.

During the rescue and post-operations of the 2008 Sichuan earthquake, heavy equipment needed to be transported to deal with the dangerous formation of quake-lakes located in extremely difficult terrain, particularly at Tangjiashan mountain, which was accessible only by foot or air. A China Flying Dragon Special Aviation Company's Mi-26T heavy lift helicopter was used to bring heavy earth-moving tractors, fuel, and equipment to the affected location to create a sluice to relieve the dangerous quake-lake.

Fleet 
The China Flying Dragon Aviation fleet consists of the following aircraft (at August 2019):

 Air King 350ER
 Avicopter AC312 
 AS350B2
 Cessna 172
 Diamond DA40
 Diamond DA42
 11 Harbin Y-12 II
 Harbin Z-9
 Schweizer 300

Previously operated
The airline also operated: 

 4 De Havilland Canada DHC-6 Twin Otter 300
 Bell 47
 Xian Y-7
 Shaanxi Y-8
 Changhe Z-11
 Beriev Be-103
 1 Mil Mi-26T
 Mil Mi-8T
 Harbin Y-11
 Mil Mi-17
 Mil Mi-8

References

External links
  China Flying Dragon Aviation official website

Airlines of China
Airlines established in 1981
Companies based in Harbin
Chinese companies established in 1981